Willow Vale, New South Wales may refer to:

 Willow Vale, New South Wales (Kiama), Australia
 Willow Vale, New South Wales (Wingecarribee), Australia